Rudolf Tihane (2 December 1892 – 30 March 1977) was an Estonian weightlifter.

He was born in Palupõhja, Viljandi County.

He started his weightlifting exercising at the sport club Aberg, located in Tartu. 1922 he was a member of Estonian national weightlifting team. He won bronze medal at 1922 World Weightlifting Championships.

He is buried at Tallinn Forest Cemetery.

References

1892 births
1977 deaths
Estonian male weightlifters
People from Elva Parish
Burials at Metsakalmistu